The Sullen Lovers; Or, The Impertinents is a 1668 comedy play by the English writer Thomas Shadwell, inspired by Molière's Les Fâcheux. It was staged by the Duke's Company at the Lincoln's Inn Fields Theatre in London. The cast included Henry Harris as Sir Positive At-All, James Nokes as  Poet Ninny, William Smith as Standford and Edward Angel as Woodcock and Anne Shadwell as Emelia.

References

Bibliography
 Howe, Elizabeth. The First English Actresses: Women and Drama, 1660-1700. Cambridge University Press, 1992.
 Nicoll, Allardyce. History of English Drama, 1660-1900: Volume 1, Restoration Drama, 1660-1700. Cambridge University Press, 1952.
 Van Lennep, W. The London Stage, 1660-1800: Volume One, 1660-1700. Southern Illinois University Press, 1960.

1668 plays
West End plays
Plays by Thomas Shadwell
Restoration comedy
Plays based on works by Molière